Oxford is a provincial electoral district in Ontario, Canada, that has been represented in the Legislative Assembly of Ontario since the 1999 provincial election.

It consists of the county of Oxford and a small portion of Brant.

Members of Provincial Parliament

Election results

2007 electoral reform referendum

References

Sources

Elections Ontario Past Election Results
Map of riding for 2018 election

Ontario provincial electoral districts
Ingersoll, Ontario
Tillsonburg
Woodstock, Ontario

fr:Oxford (circonscription)